Clarks Summit is a borough in Lackawanna County, northwest of Scranton in Northeastern Pennsylvania. The population was 5,108 at the 2020 census. It is also the northern terminus of the Pennsylvania Turnpike Northeast Extension, I-476.

History
The first settler in the area currently known as Clarks Summit was William Clark.  Clark had fought in the Battle of Bunker Hill during the Revolutionary War, and as payment for his military service, he was issued  of Pennsylvania land by Congress. Because of disputes between Pennsylvania and Connecticut over the area of land that is now northern Pennsylvania (resulting in the Pennamite-Yankee War), the land deed issued to Clark was deemed invalid by the Luzerne County land grant office.  Clark had no choice but to pay for the land himself. In March 1799, Clark and his three sons moved into a log cabin in the Abington wilderness, located on what is currently the Clarks Green Cemetery.  The first school was built in 1893 and was destroyed by fire two years later.  The village of Clarks Summit and an adjacent tract of land were incorporated into the Borough of Clarks Summit on August 30, 1911.

Clarks Summit is a location in the "Threat Level Midnight" episode of The Office.

Geography
Clarks Summit is located at  (41.492878, -75.704904).

Demographics

2010
At the 2010 census there were 5,116 people, 2,216 households, and 1,407 families living in the borough. The population density was 3,197.5 people per square mile (1,234.6/km2). There were 2,324 housing units at an average density of 1,452.5 per square mile (567.4/km2). The racial makeup of the borough was 97% White, 0.7% African American, 0.1% Native American, 1.2% Asian, 0.4% from other races, and 0.7% from two or more races. Hispanic or Latino of any race were 1.4%.

There were 2,216 households, 25.3% had children under the age of 18 living with them, 51.2% were married couples living together, 9.6% had a female householder with no husband present, and 36.5% were non-families. 32.3% of households were made up of individuals, and 18.6% were one person aged 65 or older. The average household size was 2.31 and the average family size was 2.95.

The age distribution was 21.3% under the age of 18, 58.3% from 18 to 64, and 20.4% 65 or older. The median age was 45.4 years.

2000
At the 2000 census there were 5,126 people, 2,190 households, and 1,438 families living in the borough. The population density was 3,206.7 people per square mile (1,237.0/km2). There were 2,273 housing units at an average density of 1,421.9 per square mile (548.5/km2).  The racial makeup of the borough was 97.74% White, 0.39% African American, 0.10% Native American, 1.13% Asian, 0.02% Pacific Islander, 0.23% from other races, and 0.39% from two or more races. Hispanic or Latino of any race were 0.94%.

Of the 2,190 households 27.4% had children under the age of 18 living with them, 55.8% were married couples living together, 8.0% had a female householder with no husband present, and 34.3% were non-families. 31.6% of households were one person and 17.1% were one person aged 65 or older. The average household size was 2.34 and the average family size was 2.96.

The age distribution was 22.4% under the age of 18, 5.8% from 18 to 24, 24.6% from 25 to 44, 28.4% from 45 to 64, and 18.8% 65 or older. The median age was 43 years. For every 100 females there were 89.2 males. For every 100 females age 18 and over, there were 83.2 males. The median household income was $45,298 and the median family income was $65,262. Males had a median income of $48,487 versus $26,398 for females. The per capita income for the borough was $25,080. About 1.3% of families and 3.9% of the population were below the poverty line, including none of those under age 18 and 8.0% of those age 65 or over.

Notable places

The oldest standing house is the former Snook family house, built in 1837 and located on West Grove Street.

Notable people
 Joe Amato, drag racing professional
 Bruce Beemer, 49th Pennsylvania Attorney General and former Inspector General of Pennsylvania 
 Amber Jacobs, WNBA basketball player
 Joseph McDade, congressman who lived in Clarks Summit while in office<ref>Barone, Michael; and Ujifusa, Grant. The Almanac of American Politics 1988', p. 1032. National Journal, 1987.</ref>
 Summer Rayne Oakes, eco-model and environmental activist 
 Adam Rippon, Olympic figure skater
 Cory Spangenberg, Major League Baseball infielder
 Warren Stevens, actor
 Lauren Weisberger, author of The Devil Wears Prada''

Sister city
 Ystradgynlais, Wales, UK

References

External links

 
 The Abington Suburban Newspaper, serving Clarks Summit 

Populated places established in 1799
Boroughs in Lackawanna County, Pennsylvania